Dharti Kahe Pukar Ke is a 2006 Bhojpuri Drama film directed by Aslam Sheikh. The film stars Manoj Tiwari, Sharbani Mukherjee with Bollywood star Ajay Devgn in a special appearance. The music was conducted by Dhananjay Mishra and the lyrics by Vinay Bihari. Original background music was composed by Anil Saxena. The film was released on 10 February 2006 .  The film was a super hit at the box-office  and received generally positive reviews from the critics.

Plot
The movie charts the emotional journey of Arjun. A college student with dreams of becoming an IPS officer, Arjun is basically a son of the soil. One day, when he is coming back to his village on a vacation with his bosom friend Deepak, a car accident changes his life dramatically. Deepak, who is driving the car, happens to run over a villager, Shankar, who subsequently succumbs to his injuries. Arjun, however, insists on taking the blame on himself and surrenders to the police.

Even as he does this, he is aware that by doing so, he is not merely distancing himself from his dreams but also from his beloved Rajni. In his darkest hour, SP Kunal Singh enters his life like sunlight and obtains his conditional freedom. What also draws Arjun and Kunal close to each other is their distaste for the activities of the village bully, Veer Mongia.

Kunal inspires Arjun to fight Veer Mongia in the village election. How Kunal (Who is also in the guise of a dacoit, Kanhaiyya) manages to turn the tables on Veer Mongia and how Arjun finally escapes from the shadow of guilt, form the climax.

Cast
 Manoj Tiwari as Arjun
 Ajay Devgn as SP Kunal Singh (special appearance)
 Sharbani Mukherjee as Rajun

References

External links
 

2006 films
Indian action films
2000s Bhojpuri-language films
2006 action films